Atlético Clube Alcacerense is a Portuguese sports club from Alcácer do Sal.

The men's football team played in the II AF Setúbal. The team played on the fourth-tier Terceira Divisão from 1990 to 1996. The team also participated in the Taça de Portugal during those years.

References

Football clubs in Portugal
Association football clubs established in 1979
1979 establishments in Portugal